This is a list of psychoactive plants, fungi, and animals.

Plants 
Psychoactive plants include, but are not limited to, the following examples:
 Cannabis: cannabinoids
 Tobacco: nicotine and beta-carboline alkaloids
 Coca: cocaine
 Opium Poppy: morphine, codeine, thebaine, papaverine, noscapine, and narceine
 Salvia divinorum: salvinorin A
 Khat: cathine and cathinone
 Kava: kavalactones
 Nutmeg: myristicin

 Nightshade (Solanaceae) plants containing hyoscyamine, atropine, and scopolamine:
 Datura
 Deadly nightshade (Atropa belladonna)
 Henbane (Hyoscyamus niger)
 Mandrake (Mandragora officinarum)
 Other Solanaceae

 Psychoactive cacti, which contain mainly mescaline:
 Peyote
 Other Lophophora
 Peruvian Torch cactus
 San Pedro cactus
 Other Echinopsis

 Minimally psychoactive plants that contain mainly caffeine and theobromine:
 Coffee
 Tea (also contains theanine)
 Guarana
 Yerba Mate
 Cocoa
 Kola

 Other plants:
 Mimosa hostilis: DMT
 Chacruna: DMT, NMT
Cebil and Yopo: DMT, 5-MeO-DMT, bufotenin
Mucuna pruriens: nicotine, serotonin, and bufotenin
 Morning glory species, notably Hawaiian Baby Woodrose: lysergic acid amide (LSA or ergine)
 Iboga: ibogaine, noribogaine, ibogamine, voacangine, 18-methoxycoronaridine
 Ephedra: ephedrine
 Acacia species
 Damiana
 Calea zacatechichi
 Silene capensis
 Valerian: valerian
 Areca nut: arecaidine and arecoline
 Kratom: mitragynine, mitraphylline, 7-hydroxymitragynine, raubasine, and corynantheidine
 Rauvolfia serpentina: rauwolscine
 Nymphaea caerulea (Egyptian lotus or blue lotus): apomorphine, nuciferine
 Yohimbe: yohimbine, corynantheidine
 Kanna: mesembrine and mesembrenone
 Glaucium flavum (yellow horned poppy, yellow hornpoppy or sea poppy): glaucine
 California poppies: protopine

Fungi 
 Psilocybin mushrooms: psilocybin, psilocin, aeruginascin, baeocystin, and norbaeocystin
 Amanita muscaria: ibotenic acid, muscimol, and muscarine
 Dictyonema huaorani: psilocybin, DMT, and 5-MeO-DMT
 Collybia maculata: collybolide

Animals 

 Colorado River toad (Sonoran Desert toad or Bufo alvarius): 5-MeO-DMT and bufotenin
 Asiatic toad and certain tree frogs (Osteocephalus taurinus, Osteocephalus oophagus, and Osteocephalus langsdorfii): bufotenin

 Tree frogs belonging to the genus Phyllomedusa, notably P. bicolor: opioid peptides, including deltorphin, deltorphin I, deltorphin II, and dermorphin
 Hallucinogenic fish
 Sea sponges containing DMT analogs:
Smenospongia aurea: 5-Bromo-DMT
Smenospongia echina: 5,6-Dibromo-DMT
Verongula rigida: 5-Bromo-DMT, 5,6-Dibromo-DMT, et al.
Eudistoma fragum: 5-Bromo-DMT
Paramuricea clavata: DMT, NMT
Villogorgia rubra: NMT

See also 
 List of psychoactive substances and precursor chemicals derived from genetically modified organisms
 List of psychoactive substances derived from artificial fungi biotransformation
 List of substances used in rituals
 Entheogenic drugs and the archaeological record
 List of plants used for smoking
Medicinal fungi

References

Biological sources of psychoactive drugs
Psychoactive
Lists of fungi
Psychoactive